The Bukhara Challenger is a tennis tournament held in Bukhara, Uzbekistan since 2000. The event is part of the ''challenger series and is played on outdoor hard courts.

Past finals

Singles

Doubles

External links 
 

ATP Challenger Tour
Tennis tournaments in Uzbekistan
Recurring sporting events established in 2000
2000 establishments in Uzbekistan
Hard court tennis tournaments